The Two Orphans (Spanish:Las dos huérfanas) is a 1944 Mexican historical drama film directed by José Benavides hijo and starring Susana Guízar, Julián Soler and María Elena Marqués. It is an adaptation of the play The Two Orphans by Adolphe d'Ennery and Eugène Cormon, one of a large number of film versions that have been made.

Cast
 Susana Guízar 
 Julián Soler 
 María Elena Marqués 
 Anita Blanch 
 Rafael Baledón 
 Virginia Zurí
 Rafael Banquells 
 Virginia Manzano
 Miguel Arenas 
 Víctor Junco 
 Manuel Noriega  
 Lidia Franco
 María Luisa Serrano
 Ramón G. Larrea 
 José Morcillo 
 Victoria Argota 
 Alma Riva

References

Bibliography 
 Alfred Charles Richard. Censorship and Hollywood's Hispanic image: an interpretive filmography, 1936-1955. Greenwood Press, 1993.

External links 
 

1944 films
1940s historical drama films
Mexican historical drama films
1940s Spanish-language films
Films set in the 19th century
Mexican films based on plays
Mexican black-and-white films
1944 drama films
1940s Mexican films